Wankaner State was one of the princely states of India in the historical Halar region of Kathiawar during the period of the British Raj. It was an eleven gun salute state belonging to the Kathiawar Agency of the Bombay Presidency.
Its capital was in Wankaner, located in Rajkot district, Gujarat state. Most of the territory of the state was mountainous.

History
Wankaner State was founded in 1620 by Raj Sartanji, son of Prathirajji, eldest son of maharana Raj Chandrasinghji of a rajput ruler of Halvad (1584–1628).

In 1807 Wankaner State became a British protectorate when Maharana Raj Sahib Chandrasinhji II Kesarisinhji signed a treaty with the British. In 1862 the ruler of the state received a sanad giving the monarch authorization to adopt an heir. The ruler acceded to the Indian Union on 15 February 1948.

Rulers
The rulers of Wankaner were titled 'Maharana Raj Sahib'.

1679 – 1721 Chandrasinhji I Raisinhji (d. 1721)
1721 – 1728 Prithvirajji Chandrasinhji (d. 1728)
1728 – 1749 Kesarisinhji I Chandrasinhji (d. 1749)
1749 – 1784 Bharoji Kesarisinhji (d. 1784)
1784 – 1787 Kesarisinhji II Raisinhji (d. 1787)
1787 – 1839 Chandrasinhji II Kesarisinhji (d. 1839)
1839 – 1860 Vakhatsinhji Chandrasinhji (d. 1860)
1860 – 12 Jun 1881 Banesinhji Jaswantsihnji (b. 1842 – d. 1881)
1860 – 1861                .... -Regent
12 Jun 1881 – 15 August 1947 Amarsinhji Banesinhji (b. 1879 – d. 1954) (from 12 December 1911, Sir Amarsinhji Banesinhji)
12 Jan 1881 – 1888 Ganpatrao Narayen Laud -Regent
1888 – 18 March 1899         .... -Regent

See also
 List of Rajput dynasties
 Political integration of India

References

States and territories established in 1947
Rajputs
History of Rajkot
Bombay Presidency
1620 establishments in India
1807 establishments in India
1947 disestablishments in India
Princely states of India
Princely states of Gujarat